The Regional Assembly of Murcia (Spanish: Asamblea Regional de Murcia) is the autonomous parliament of the Region of Murcia, one of the autonomous communities of Spain. The unicameral assembly, which contained 45 elected legislative seats, is located in the Murcian city of Cartagena, Spain.

The People's Party (PP) retained its majority in the 2011 Murcian Regional election with 33 seats out of 45. It went on to lose its majority in 2015, falling 1 seat short of a majority with 22 seats. It now relies on the support of C's to stay in power.

Membership

Results of the elections to the Regional Assembly of Murcia

References

 
Assembly
Murcia